Tevin Ford Coleman (born April 16, 1993) is an American football running back who is a free agent. He was drafted by the Atlanta Falcons in the third round of the 2015 NFL Draft. He played college football at Indiana, where he was a unanimous All-American. He also played for the New York Jets.

Early years
Coleman attended Oak Forest High School in Oak Forest, Illinois. He played running back, wide receiver, and cornerback, and also returned kicks and punts. He was named the 2011 Southtown Star Player of the Year. As a senior, he rushed for 949 yards on 83 carries with 13 touchdowns, and also had 16 receptions for 345 yards and five touchdowns.

In addition, Coleman was on the school's track & field team, where he competed as a sprinter and jumper. He was one of the best 100-meter sprinters and long-jumpers in the state of Illinois as a high schooler. At the 2011 IHSA State Championships, he placed fourth in the 100m, at 10.86, and took second in the long jump, getting a personal-best mark of 7.16 meters. At the 2011 Thornton Classic Meet, he took gold in the long jump, with a mark of 6.88 meters, and finished second in the 100 m, at 10.8 seconds. At the 2011 IHSA 2A State T&F Championship, he ran the 100 meters in a PR of 10.5 seconds, on his way to a second-place finish.

Considered a three-star recruit by the Rivals.com recruiting network, Coleman was ranked as the No. 37 running back nationally in 2012. He chose Indiana over scholarship offers from Georgia Tech, Minnesota, and Michigan State.

College career
Coleman attended and played college football for Indiana University from 2012 to 2014 under head coach Kevin Wilson.

As a true freshman in 2012, Coleman played in 12 games with two starts. He rushed for 225 yards on 51 attempts and one touchdown and also had 566 kick return yards and a touchdown. As a sophomore in 2013, Coleman started the first nine games of the season, before suffering an ankle sprain that caused him to miss the final three games. He finished the year with 958 rushing yards on 131 carries with 12 touchdowns.

In the first game of his junior season in 2014, Coleman rushed for 247 yards and two touchdowns against Indiana State. In the following game, at Bowling Green, he had 190 rushing yards and three rushing touchdowns. On October 4, against North Texas, he had 150 rushing yards and a rushing touchdown. In the next game, against Iowa, he had 219 rushing yards and three rushing touchdowns. Coleman's 307-yard day in a loss at Rutgers on November 15 became second highest rushing day in school history, behind only Anthony Thompson at Wisconsin in 1989. On November 22, against Ohio State, he had 228 rushing yards and three rushing touchdowns. On November 25, Coleman and fellow Big Ten Conference running backs Melvin Gordon (Wisconsin) and Ameer Abdullah (Nebraska) were named the three finalists for the Doak Walker Award. In the final game of the 2014 season, on November 29 versus rival Purdue, Coleman rushed for 130 yards on 29 carries, finishing the season with 2,036 yards. He became the 18th player in NCAA Division I FBS history to reach 2,000-yard rushing mark in a season. His 2,036 rushing yards also broke the school's single-season record, which had been held by Vaughn Dunbar who had 1,805 yards in 1991. Coleman finished seventh in the 2014 Heisman Trophy voting having received two first place votes.

On December 29, 2014, Coleman announced that he would forgo his senior season and enter the 2015 NFL Draft.

Statistics

Professional career

Atlanta Falcons
Coleman was selected by the Atlanta Falcons in the third round with the 73rd overall pick of the 2015 NFL Draft. He was the fifth of 18 running backs to be selected that year. On May 12, 2015, Coleman signed his rookie contract, a four-year contract worth $3,219,012, with a $745,244 signing bonus.

2015 season: Rookie year
On September 8, 2015, due to the injury of Devonta Freeman, Coleman was named the Falcons feature running back to start the season. On September 14, 2015, Coleman made his NFL debut, running for 80 yards on a season-high 20 carries against the Philadelphia Eagles on Monday Night Football. On September 20, 2015, Coleman scored his first touchdown of his career against the New York Giants. Coleman suffered a fractured rib in the game and was sidelined for Week 3 and Week 4 against the Dallas Cowboys and the Houston Texans, respectively. On November 29, 2015, Coleman ran for a season-high 110 yards on 18 carries against the Minnesota Vikings, his first 100-yard game of his career. In his rookie season, Coleman rushed for 392 yards for one touchdown. Coleman was ranked 11th among rookies in rushing yards.

2016 season
During the season opener, Coleman caught five passes for 95 yards in a 31–24 loss against the Tampa Bay Buccaneers. In the next game, he scored his first touchdown of the season, a 13-yarder, against the Oakland Raiders. On September 26, Coleman scored a career-high three touchdowns against the New Orleans Saints, his first multi-touchdown game. On October 9, Coleman caught four passes for a career-high 132 yards and a touchdown against the Denver Broncos, his first touchdown reception of his career. On October 23, Coleman ran for 64 yards on eight carries and a touchdown against the San Diego Chargers. Coleman ran 30 yards for the touchdown. Coleman suffered a hamstring injury in the game. Coleman was sidelined from Week 8 and Week 9's matchups against the Green Bay Packers and the Tampa Bay Buccaneers, respectively.

On February 5, 2017, Coleman scored a six-yard receiving touchdown in the third quarter of Super Bowl LI against the New England Patriots. In addition, he had seven rushes for 29 yards in the Super Bowl. However, his efforts were not enough as the Patriots defeated the Falcons by a score of 34–28 in overtime.

Coleman's 6.3 yards per touch in 2016 was second among NFL running backs with more than 100 touches (carries plus receptions).

2017 season
During a Week 2 34–23 victory over the Green Bay Packers, Coleman had six carries for 42 yards and a three-yard receiving touchdown in the first game in the new Mercedes-Benz Stadium. His touchdown reception was the first receiving touchdown in the new stadium's history. During a Week 12 34–20 victory over the Tampa Bay Buccaneers, he had 19 carries for 97 yards and two touchdowns for his second career game with multiple touchdown scores.

Coleman finished the 2017 season with 628 rushing yards, five rushing touchdowns, 27 receptions, 299 receiving yards, and three receiving touchdowns. The Falcons made the playoffs as the #6-seed. In the Wild Card Round, against the Los Angeles Rams, he had 40 rushing yards and 28 receiving yards in the 26–13 victory. In the Divisional Round against the Philadelphia Eagles, he had 79 rushing yards and a 14-yard reception in the 15–10 loss.

2018 season
During a Week 2 31–24 victory over the Carolina Panthers, Coleman recorded 107 rushing yards for his second career game with 100+ rushing yards. He was named the starter the rest of the season in Week 6 after a season-ending injury to Devonta Freeman. In Week 15, a 40–14 victory over the Arizona Cardinals, Coleman rushed for a career-high 145 yards.

Coleman finished the season with a career-high 800 rushing yards and five receiving touchdowns, he also eclipsed 1,000 yards from scrimmage for the first time in his career.

San Francisco 49ers
On March 14, 2019, Coleman signed a two-year, $10 million contract with the San Francisco 49ers.

2019 season

During the season-opener against the Tampa Bay Buccaneers, Coleman rushed for 23 yards on six carries but suffered a high-ankle sprain that kept him sidelined for four weeks. The 49ers went on to win on the road by a score of 31–17. During Week 5 against the Cleveland Browns, he returned from his injury and rushed 16 times for 97 yards and his first rushing touchdown of the season in a 31–3 victory. Three weeks later against the Carolina Panthers, Coleman had 105 rushing yards and four touchdowns as the 49ers won 51–13. He was just the third 49er to score four touchdowns in a game, and the first since Hall-of-Famer Jerry Rice in 1993.

Coleman finished his first season with the 49ers with 544 rushing yards and six touchdowns along with 21 receptions for 180 yards and a touchdown.

In the Divisional Round of the playoffs against the Minnesota Vikings, Coleman rushed 22 times for 105 yards and two touchdowns during the 27–10 victory. In the NFC Championship against the Green Bay Packers, he had six carries for 21 yards, but left the game early with a shoulder injury. Despite missing the rest of the game, the 49ers still won, 37–20, to advance to Super Bowl LIV. In the Super Bowl, Coleman recorded five carries for 28 yards and caught a three-yard reception, but the 49ers lost to the Kansas City Chiefs by a score of 31–20.

2020 season
On September 26, 2020, Coleman was placed on injured reserve after suffering a sprained knee in Week 2. He was activated on October 31.

New York Jets
On March 25, 2021, Coleman signed a one-year, $2 million contract with New York Jets. He played in 11 games with five starts, finishing second on the team with 356 rushing yards and no touchdowns along with 11 catches for 49 yards.

On March 17, 2022, Coleman re-signed with the Jets. He was released on August 30, 2022.

San Francisco 49ers (second stint)
On September 21, 2022, Coleman signed with the San Francisco 49ers practice squad. He was signed to the active roster on October 12, 2022. In Week 5, against the Carolina Panthers, he had a rushing touchdown and a receiving touchdown in the 37–15 victory. On October 25, Coleman was released, but re-signed to the practice squad the next day. His practice squad contract with the team expired after the season on January 29, 2023.

NFL career statistics

Regular season

Postseason

References

External links

 Tevin Coleman on Twitter

 San Francisco 49ers bio
 Indiana Hoosiers bio

1993 births
Living people
African-American players of American football
All-American college football players
American football running backs
Atlanta Falcons players
Indiana Hoosiers football players
New York Jets players
People from Oak Forest, Illinois
People from Tinley Park, Illinois
Players of American football from Illinois
San Francisco 49ers players
Sportspeople from Cook County, Illinois
21st-century African-American sportspeople